Taynikma is a Danish book series. The idea and concept were developed by Merlin P. Mann and Jan Kjær.

The series consists of sixteen volumes, each of which ends with a four-page drawing school. The first volume came out in October 2005; the last, in 2012. The series' publisher was Phabel.

The series was also released in Norway, Sweden, Finland, Iceland, Russia, and the United Kingdom (first 4 books). The books won the Orla Award in 2007 as the year's best comics in Denmark. In 2010, it won the Taynikma Drawing School by Jan Kjær Orla Prize. 

The authors have since started a new Taynikma-book/series.

The series' titles 
 Book 1: Master Thief
 Book 2: The Rats
 Book 3: Tower Of The Sun
 Book 4: The Lost Catacombs
 Book 5: The Secret Arena
 Book 6: The Battle of Clans
 Book 7: Henzel's Trap
 Book 8: The Forest of Shadows
 Book 9: The Fortress of Light
 Book 10: The Last Battle
 Books 11-16: Only in Denmark

References

External links 
 Website: Taynikma.co.uk

Danish books
2000s books
2010s books